The Boston crab is a professional wrestling hold that typically starts with one wrestler lying in a supine position on the mat, with the other wrestler standing and facing them. It is a type of spinal lock where the wrestler hooks each of the opponent’s legs in one of their arms and then turns the opponent face-down, stepping over them in the process. The final position has the wrestler in a semi-sitting position and facing away from the opponent, with the opponent’s back and legs bent back toward their head. The original name for the maneuver was the Backbreaker, before that term became known for its current usage. In modern wrestling, the Boston crab is not treated as a lethal submission maneuver, even though it was considered a match-ending hold in the past.

In submission grappling, the Boston crab (generally the half Boston crab) can be used to set up a straight ankle lock. On September 30, 2017, Jonno Mears became the first fighter in mixed martial arts history to win a fight with the Boston crab.

Variations

Twist of Fate
Somewhat similar to the cross-legged Boston Crab, this move sees the attacking wrestler cross both of the opponent's legs before stepping over so that the opponent stays flat on their back, while the attacker twists the defender's body. Not to be confused with Matt and Jeff Hardy's finisher, which is a Front Facelock Cutter.

Boston crab with knee 
Similar to a normal Boston crab, this move sees the attacking wrestler use a single knee to add additional pressure by pressing it into the opponent's back. An elevated variation, best known as Chris Jericho's Liontamer, also exists.

Cross-legged Boston crab 
This variation of a normal Boston crab sees the attacking wrestler get a hold of both of the opponent's feet, then crossing both legs over before tucking both legs under its same armpit (i.e. left leg under wrestler’s left armpit). After completing this, the attacking wrestler turns the opponent face-down, stepping over them in the process to secure the hold.

Elevated Boston crab 
Similar to a normal Boston crab, this move sees the attacking wrestler stand farther back. The step-back allows additional pressure to be placed on the opponent's back from the higher angle, hence the name. This move is best known as Chris Jericho's Walls of Jericho.

Inverted Boston crab 
The wrestler grabs the legs of an opponent lying supine while standing over the opponent, steps in front of the opponent's arms, and either remains standing or falls backwards, stretching the legs back. A single leg variation, also known as a Stump Puller, involves only one of the opponent's legs being stretched. A figure-four leglock variation exists as well. This move can be used as a pin as well as a submission maneuver.

Over-the-shoulder single leg Boston crab
Also commonly known as a Stretch Muffler, this move sees the wrestler stand over a face-down opponent lying on the ground and lift one leg of the opponent and drapes it over the wrestler's own shoulders. The wrestler then uses their arms to force the shin and thigh of the opponent down, thereby placing pressure on the opponent's knee. An arm-trap version of this move exists, where the wrestler locks one of the opponent's arms between the wrestler's legs and performs the move either sitting or kneeling on the ring mat the whole time as opposed to standing. This move can best be described as a Torture Rack applied to a single leg. Brock Lesnar briefly used this as the Brock Lock.

Reverse Boston crab 

Not to be confused with the inverted Boston crab, this move is executed by an aggressor standing over a face-down opponent facing in the same direction. From there the aggressor take each of the opponent's leg under each arm. With both legs under each armpit, they push down, putting pressure on the knees & lower back of the opponent.  Colt Cabana calls it the Billy Goat's Curse, referencing his Chicago-area heritage.

Rocking horse 
This Boston crab variation sees the wrestler lock the opponent in a standard version of the hold before lifting them off the ground by their arms (while still in the hold), and rocking them back and forth, putting additional pressure on their back.

Single leg Boston crab 

Also known as a half Boston crab or a half crab, a move that typically starts with the opponent on their back, and the attacking wrestler standing and facing them. The attacking wrestler hooks one of the opponent's legs under one of their arms, and then turns the opponent face-down, stepping over them in the process. The final position has the dominant wrestler in a semi-sitting position and facing away from the opponent who is lying face-down and their own leg bent backwards toward their head. A variation with the attacking wrestler kneeling side-ways while having the leg hooked can be performed. Lance Storm used this maneuver as a counter to an oncoming opponent by grabbing one of the opponent's legs in a single leg takedown and using the momentum to roll backwards into the hold.

Tequila Sunrise 
The attacking wrestler approaches a supine opponent and seizes one of their arms before walking around the opponent's head to their other side, thus forcing the opponent to roll onto their stomach. The wrestler then kneels on the back of the opponent, clinching the opponent's arm behind their knee, and applies a single leg Boston crab.

Rope-hung Boston crab 

This move, also known as the Tarantula in reference to Yoshihiro Tajiri's naming of the move, involves a wrestler hooking each of an opponent's legs in one of their arms and draping the opponent over the top rope. At this point the wrestler hooks the arms of the opponent with their legs, securing the hold. As this move involves the use of the ropes, and allows the opponent to touch the ropes (which forces a wrestler to break a submission hold), this hold must usually be broken before the referee completes a five-count. Otherwise, the wrestler will be disqualified. This is the reason why it is best used during no disqualification matches or "I Quit" matches.

See also
Professional wrestling holds

References

Professional wrestling moves